Hadas (Hebrew: הדס) is a Jewish name that may refer to the following notable people:
Given name
Hadas Gold (born 1988), American media and business reporter
Hadas Malada-Matzri (born 1984), Ethiopian Israeli doctor 
Hadas Thier (born 1976), American activist, writer and journalist
Hadas Yaron (born 1990), Israeli actress

Surname
Eran Hadas, Israeli poet, software developer, new media artist and author
Ishay Hadas  (born 1955), Israeli television producer, voice-over actor and activist
Moses Hadas (1900–1966), American teacher, classical scholar and translator
Rachel Hadas (born 1948), American poet, teacher and translator, daughter of Moses
Shmuel Hadas (1931–2010), Israeli diplomat
Yacov Hadas-Handelsman (born 1957), Israeli Ambassador to Hungary

See also
 František Hadaš I (1917–1995), Czech archer
 František Hadaš (born 1941), Czech archer

Hebrew-language surnames